Laurent Gané (born 7 March 1973 in Nouméa, New Caledonia) is a former French professional track cyclist.

He was awarded the Vélo d'Or français, which is awarded by a panel of French journalists, in 1999 and 2003.

Gané is also the cousin of cyclist Hervé Gané.

Major results

1996
3rd Team Sprint, Track World Championships (with Florian Rousseau & Hervé Robert Thuet)

1999
1st Team Sprint, Track World Championships (with Florian Rousseau & Arnaud Tournant)

2000
1st Team Sprint, Track World Championships (with Florian Rousseau & Arnaud Tournant)
1st Team Sprint, Olympic Games (with Florian Rousseau & Arnaud Tournant)
4th Sprint, Olympic Games

2001
1st Team Sprint, Track World Championships (with Florian Rousseau & Arnaud Tournant)

2003
2nd Team Sprint, Track World Championships (with Mickaël Bourgain & Arnaud Tournant)

2004
1st Team Sprint, Track World Championships (with Mickaël Bourgain & Arnaud Tournant)
3rd Team Sprint, Olympic Games (with Mickaël Bourgain & Arnaud Tournant)
4th Sprint, Olympic Games

References

External links
 

1973 births
Living people
French male cyclists
People from Nouméa
Olympic medalists in cycling
Cyclists at the 2000 Summer Olympics
Cyclists at the 2004 Summer Olympics
Olympic cyclists of France
Olympic gold medalists for France
Olympic bronze medalists for France
UCI Track Cycling World Champions (men)
Medalists at the 2004 Summer Olympics
Medalists at the 2000 Summer Olympics
French track cyclists